WTJR (channel 16) is a religious television station in Quincy, Illinois, United States, owned and operated by the Christian Television Network (CTN). The station's studios are located on North Sixth Street in downtown Quincy, and its transmitter is located on Cannonball Road northeast of the city. WTJR offers 24-hour religious programming, much of which is produced either locally or at the CTN home base in Clearwater, Florida.

CTN acquired WLCF from another religious broadcaster, locally based Believers Broadcasting Corporation, in May 2006.

Technical information

Subchannels
The station's digital signal is multiplexed:

Analog-to-digital conversion
WTJR shut down its analog signal, over UHF channel 16, on January 20, 2009. The station's digital signal remained on its pre-transition UHF channel 32. Through the use of PSIP, digital television receivers display the station's virtual channel as its former UHF analog channel 16.

References

External links
WTJR

Television stations in the Quincy–Hannibal area
Television channels and stations established in 1986
1986 establishments in Illinois
Christian Television Network affiliates